Polyether ether ketone (PEEK) is a colourless organic thermoplastic polymer in the polyaryletherketone (PAEK) family, used in engineering applications. The polymer was first developed in November 1978, later being introduced to the market by Victrex PLC, then Imperial Chemical Industries (ICI) in the early 1980s.

Synthesis
PEEK polymers are obtained by step-growth polymerization by the dialkylation of bisphenolate salts. Typical is the reaction of 4,4'-difluorobenzophenone with the disodium salt of hydroquinone, which is generated in situ by deprotonation with sodium carbonate. The reaction is conducted around 300 °C in polar aprotic solvents - such as diphenyl sulfone.

Properties
PEEK is a semicrystalline thermoplastic with excellent mechanical and chemical resistance properties that are retained to high temperatures. The processing conditions used to mould PEEK can influence the crystallinity and hence the mechanical properties. Its Young's modulus is 3.6 GPa and its tensile strength is 90 to 100 MPa. PEEK has a glass transition temperature of around 143 °C (289 °F) and melts around 343 °C (662 °F). Some grades have a useful operating temperature of up to 250 °C (482 °F). The thermal conductivity increases nearly linearly with temperature between room temperature and solidus temperature. It is highly resistant to thermal degradation, as well as to attack by both organic and aqueous environments. It is attacked by halogens and strong Brønsted and Lewis acids, as well as some halogenated compounds and aliphatic hydrocarbons at high temperatures. It is soluble in concentrated sulfuric acid at room temperature, although dissolution can take a very long time unless the polymer is in a form with a high surface-area-to-volume ratio, such as a fine powder or thin film. It has high resistance to biodegradation.

Applications
PEEK is used to fabricate items for demanding applications, including bearings, piston parts, pumps, high-performance liquid chromatography columns, compressor plate valves, and electrical cable insulation. It is one of the few plastics compatible with ultra-high vacuum applications, which makes it suitable for aerospace, automotive, and chemical industries. PEEK is used in medical implants, for example in creating a partial replacement skull in neurosurgical applications. 

PEEK is used in spinal fusion devices and reinforcing rods. It is radiolucent, but it is hydrophobic causing it to not fully fuse with bone. PEEK seals and manifolds are commonly used in fluid applications. PEEK also performs well in high temperature applications (up to 500 °F/260 °C). Because of this and its low thermal conductivity, it is also used in fused filament fabrication (FFF) printing to thermally separate the hot end from the cold end.

Processing options
PEEK melts at a relatively high temperature (343 °C / 649.4 °F) compared to most other thermoplastics. In the range of its melting temperature it can be processed using injection moulding or extrusion methods. It is technically feasible to process granular PEEK into filament form and 3D printing parts from the filament material using fused deposition modeling – FDM (or fused filament fabrication – FFF) technology. PEEK filaments have been demonstrated for producing medical devices up to class IIa. With this new filament, it is possible to use the FFF method for different medical applications like dentures.

In its solid state PEEK is readily machinable, for example, by CNC milling machines and is commonly used to produce high-quality plastic parts that are thermostable and both electrically and thermally insulating. Filled grades of PEEK can also be CNC machined, but special care must be taken to properly manage stresses in the material.

PEEK is a high-performance polymer, but its high price, due to its complex production process, restricts its use to only the most demanding applications.

Shape-memory PEEK in biomechanical applications
PEEK is not traditionally a shape-memory polymer; however, recent advances in processing have allowed shape-memory behaviour in PEEK with mechanical activation. This technology has expanded to applications in orthopaedic surgery.

References

Polyethers
Organic polymers
Thermoplastics
Fused filament fabrication